Sarah Broom (1972-2013), was a New Zealand poet

Sarah Broom may also refer to:
 Sarah M. Broom, American writer and memoirist
 Sarah Broom Macnaughtan (1864-1916), Scottish novelist
 Sarah Broom Poetry Prize, named after Sarah Broom New Zealand poet